Nietta Zocchi (10 July 1909 – 23 April 1981) was an Italian film actress. She appeared in 70 films between 1936 and 1976.

Selected filmography

 The Amnesiac (1936) - Zelinda (uncredited)
 To Live (1936) - Una spettatrice al concerto
 Sette giorni all'altro mondo (1936) - Nurse
 The Dance of Time (1936)
 The Anonymous Roylott (1936)
 But It's Nothing Serious (1937)
 Adam's Tree (1938) - Infermiera Ersilia
 Il suo destino (1938) - Una reclusa
 The Faceless Voice (1939) - La cameriera della primattrice
 Heartbeat (1939) - Un' altra ragazza disoccupata
 The Widow (1939) - Un'invitata alla festa
 Department Store (1939) - La commessa racchia (uncredited)
 Mamma (1941) - La cameriera dell'albergo a Venezia
 Orizzonte dipinto (1941) - Blandina
 Il re del circo (1941) - La signora Speranza
 Villa da vendere (1941) - Gabriella
 A Woman Has Fallen (1941) - Una cliente della casa di mode
 La scuola dei timidi (1941) - La segretaria di Roc
 The Jester's Supper (1942) - Cinzia
 After Casanova's Fashion (1942) - Donna Rosalia
 Gli assi della risata (1943) - NZ (segment "Il mio pallone")
 Il fiore sotto gli occhi (1954) - La cameriera degli Aroca
 The Transporter (1950) - Una cliente di La Motta
 Accidents to the Taxes!! (1951)
 Without a Flag (1951) - Insegnante di francese
 The Adventures of Mandrin (1952)
 The Dream of Zorro (1952) - Dona Hermosa Alcazan
 The Eternal Chain (1952) - The 'Alhambra' Owner
 Wife for a Night (1952) - Yvonne
 Il romanzo della mia vita (1952) - Maria De Marchis' Aunt (uncredited)
 Cani e gatti (1952)
 Too Young for Love (1953)
 Bread, Love and Dreams (1953) - Una comare intrigante (uncredited)
 My Life Is Yours (1953)
 100 Years of Love (1954) - Nunziata (segment "Garibaldina")
 Cose da pazzi (1954) - Madwoman playing canasta
 Romeo and Juliet (1954) - Lady Montague
 Cento serenate (1954)
 Alvaro piuttosto corsaro (1954)
 Chéri-Bibi (1955) - La governante
 La ladra (1955) - Signora della orfania (uncredited)
 The Letters Page (1955) - Pipinuccio Gigliozzi's Wife
 Io sono la Primula Rossa (1955) - Lady Margareth
 Desperate Farewell (1955) - Professor Farri's Secretary
 Rigoletto e la sua tragedia (1956) - Giovanna
 Wives and Obscurities (1956) - Signora Tumedei
 The Sword and the Cross (1956)
 Donne, amore e matrimoni (1956) - Moglie del colonnello
 Cantando sotto le stelle (1956) - Signora Diotallevi
 Vivendo cantando... che male ti fò? (1957) - La direttrice dell'istituto
 Mattino di primavera (1957)
 Il Conte di Matera (1958) - Governante di Greta
 Via col para... vento (1958)
 First Love (1959) - Teresa (uncredited)
 Sunset in Naples (1959)
 The Son of the Red Corsair (1959) - Isabella
 Quel tesoro di papà (1959) - Franco de Licori's Mother
 La duchessa di Santa Lucia (1959)
 La Pica sul Pacifico (1959) - The Lady launching the boat
 Il raccomandato di ferro (1959)
 Tipi da spiaggia (1959) - Eva - Barbara's acquaintance (uncredited)
 Le pillole di Ercole (1960) - La signora violentata
 Mariti in pericolo (1960) - Madre di Elena
 Ferragosto in bikini (1960) - La signora Porro
 Romulus and the Sabines (1961) - Ersilia, Titus' Wife
 Rocco e le sorelle (1961)
 I magnifici tre (1961) - Nina
 La donna degli altri è sempre più bella (1963) - La madre di Savina (segment "Bagnino Lover")
 I figli del leopardo (1965)
 Veneri al sole (1965) - La madre di Concettina (segment "Una domenica a Fregene")
 Spiaggia libera (1966) - La Contessa
 Ghosts – Italian Style (1967)
 Incensurato, provata disonestà, carriera assicurata, cercasi (1972)
 Il secondo tragico Fantozzi (1976) - Contessa Serbelloni Mazzanti Viendalmare

References

External links

1909 births
1981 deaths
Italian film actresses
20th-century Italian actresses